Sidi El Hari Mosque was a Tunisian mosque for Aissawa brotherhood located in the north-east of the medina of Tunis.
It does not exist anymore.

Localization
The mosque was located in Sidi El Hari Street, bear Bab Cartagena, one of the gates of the medina that got destroyed.

Etymology
It got its name from a saint, Sidi El Hari whose zaouia is a classified monument.

References 

Mosques in Tunis